Malcolm Graeme Cameron,  (February 24, 1857 – August 10, 1925) was a lawyer and politician in Ontario, Canada. He represented Huron West in the Legislative Assembly of Ontario from 1902 to 1908 as a Liberal.

The son of Malcolm Colin Cameron and Jessie H. McLean, he was born in Goderich and was educated there. Cameron served on the town council for Goderich, also serving as reeve and as mayor. He was named a King's Counsel in 1902. He ran unsuccessfully for the Huron West seat in the Canadian House of Commons in 1911.

Cameron published A Treatise on the Law of Dower in 1882.

References

External links

1857 births
1925 deaths
Ontario Liberal Party MPPs
Mayors of places in Ontario
Canadian King's Counsel